Bhatt Majra is a village in the Patiala district of Punjab state of India.

See also 
 Punjab, India

References 

Villages in Patiala district